HD 63922 is a class B0III (blue giant) star in the constellation Puppis. Its apparent magnitude is 4.11 and it is approximately 1600 light years away based on parallax.

It is a multiple star; the primary has one close companion, Ab, at 0.3" separation and magnitude 7.19, and a more distant one, B, at 59.1" and 8.79 magnitude.

References

Puppis
B-type giants
Binary stars
Puppis, P
CD-46 3458
038164
3055
063922